Delhi   is a city in Delaware County, Iowa, United States. The population was 420 at the time of the 2020 census.

History
Delhi was founded in the early 1840s. The county seat was once located there. Emma Swinburne, who married George C. Junkin, was from Delhi.

Geography
Delhi is located at  (42.428028, -91.329971) near the Maquoketa River. The Delhi Dam on the river in Delhi's southwest created Hartwick Lake. A portion of the dam failed on July 24, 2010, flooding areas downstream.

Delhi is located on State Highway 38.

Demographics

2010 census
As of the census of 2010, there were 460 people, 206 households, and 130 families living in the city. The racial makeup of the city was 99.1% White and 0.9% from two or more races. Hispanic or Latino of any race were 0.7% of the population.

There were 206 households, of which 27.2% had children under the age of 18 living with them, 47.1% were married couples living together, 11.2% had a female householder with no husband present, 4.9% had a male householder with no wife present, and 36.9% were non-families. 30.6% of all households were made up of individuals, and 13.6% had someone living alone who was 65 years of age or older. The average household size was 2.23 and the average family size was 2.77.

The median age in the city was 44.6 years. 23.5% of residents were under the age of 18; 3.7% were between the ages of 18 and 24; 23.5% were from 25 to 44; 32% were from 45 to 64; and 17.4% were 65 years of age or older. The gender makeup of the city was 48.9% male and 51.1% female.

2000 census
As of the census of 2000, there were 458 people, 199 households, and 130 families living in the city. The racial makeup of the city was 99.56% White, 0.00% African American, 0.22% Asian, and 0.22% from two or more races. 0.22% of the population were Hispanic or Latino of any race.

There were 199 households, out of which 26.6% had children under the age of 18 living with them, 54.3% were married couples living together, 7.0% had a female householder with no husband present, and 34.2% were non-families. 28.1% of all households were made up of individuals, and 15.1% had someone living alone who was 65 years of age or older. The average household size was 2.30 and the average family size was 2.77.

In the city, the population was spread out, with 22.3% under the age of 18, 7.2% from 18 to 24, 27.7% from 25 to 44, 22.5% from 45 to 64, and 20.3% who were 65 years of age or older. The median age was 42 years. For every 100 females, there were 96.6 males. For every 100 females age 18 and over, there were 100.0 males.

The median income for a household in the city was $38,636, and the median income for a family was $46,607. Males had a median income of $34,167 versus $21,375 for females. The per capita income for the city was $19,751. About 6.7% of families and 5.7% of the population were below the poverty line, including 4.2% of those under age 18 and 10.8% of those age 65 or over.

Education
The Maquoketa Valley Community School District operates local area public schools.

References

Cities in Iowa
Cities in Delaware County, Iowa
1840s establishments in Iowa